Charles Brackeen (born March 13, 1940 in Eufaula, Oklahoma, United States; died November 5, 2021, Carson, California) was an American jazz saxophonist who primarily played tenor saxophone, but also played soprano saxophone. He was previously married to pianist Joanne Brackeen, with whom he had four children.

Brackeen originally studied violin and piano before switching to saxophone at the age of 10. He played in a recording with members of the Ornette Coleman Quartet in 1968 and on Jazz Composer's Orchestra recordings by Don Cherry (1973), Leroy Jenkins (1975), and Paul Motian for ECM (1978 and 1979).  He recorded again as a leader in 1987, when he recorded three albums for Silkheart Records.

Discography

As Leader
 Rhythm X (Strata-East, 1968) 
 Bannar (Silkheart Records, 1987) 
 Attainment (Silkheart, 1987)
 Worshippers Come Nigh (Silkheart, 1987)

As sideman
with Ahmed Abdullah
Liquid Magic (Silheart, 1987)
with Don Cherry
Relativity Suite (JCOA, 1973)
with Dennis González
 Namesake (Silkheart, 1987)
 Debenge, Debenge (Silkheart, 1988)
 The Desert Wind (Silkheart, 1989)
with Ronald Shannon Jackson's Decoding Society
 Eye On You (About Time, 1980)
 Nasty (Moers Music, 1981)
with Leroy Jenkins
 For Players Only (JCOA, 1975)
with Melodic Art-Tet
 Melodic Art–Tet (NoBusiness, 1974 [2013])
with Paul Motian
 Dance (ECM, 1977)
 Le Voyage (ECM, 1979)
with William Parker
 Through Acceptance of the Mystery Peace (Centering Records, 1974–79)

References 

1940 births
2021 deaths
20th-century African-American musicians
American jazz tenor saxophonists
American male saxophonists
Strata-East Records artists
21st-century American saxophonists
21st-century American male musicians
American male jazz musicians
People from Eufaula, Oklahoma